Spanners is the third studio album by English electronic music group The Black Dog. It was released via Warp on 16 January 1995. It peaked at number 30 on the UK Albums Chart.

Critical reception

Ned Raggett of AllMusic praised Spanners, saying, "The highlights are many, most often achieving a solid combination of dancefloor friendliness and unexpected sonic trickery." David Browne of Entertainment Weekly described it as "a series of antiseptic, hypnosis-inducing machine burbles, but with just the right amount of jarring elements to keep listeners awake." Shana Ting Lipton of CMJ New Music Monthly called it "an epic journey through life in the modern world."

In 2017, Spanners ranked at number 42 on Pitchforks list of "The 50 Best IDM Albums of All Time".

Track listing

Charts

References

External links
 

1995 albums
The Black Dog (band) albums
Warp (record label) albums